Ferndale is a census-designated place (CDP) in Lake County, Florida, United States. The population was 472 at the 2010 census, up from 233 at the 2000 census. It is part of the Orlando–Kissimmee Metropolitan Statistical Area.

Geography

Ferndale is located in southeastern Lake County and is bordered to the west by the city of Minneola, to the southeast by the town of Montverde, and to the northeast by Lake Apopka.

Demographics

As of the census of 2000, there were 233 people, 83 households, and 68 families residing in the CDP. The racial makeup of the CDP was 97.42% White, 0.43% African American, 1.72% from other races, and 0.43% from two or more races. Hispanic or Latino of any race were 3.86% of the population.

There were 83 households, out of which 34.9% had children under the age of 18 living with them, 67.5% were married couples living together, 10.8% had a female householder with no husband present, and 16.9% were non-families. 10.8% of all households were made up of individuals, and 6.0% had someone living alone who was 65 years of age or older.  The average household size was 2.81 and the average family size was 3.04.

In the CDP, the population was spread out, with 26.2% under the age of 18, 9.4% from 18 to 24, 28.8% from 25 to 44, 27.0% from 45 to 64, and 8.6% who were 65 years of age or older.  The median age was 36 years. For every 100 females, there were 97.5 males.  For every 100 females age 18 and over, there were 95.5 males.

The median income for a household in the CDP was $54,271, and the median income for a family was $53,125. Males had a median income of $36,750 versus $25,875 for females. The per capita income for the CDP was $18,206.  None of the population or families were below the poverty line.

References

Census-designated places in Lake County, Florida
Greater Orlando
Census-designated places in Florida